The Michigan English Language Assessment Battery (or MELAB) was a standardized test, created by CaMLA, which evaluated proficiency in understanding, writing and speaking the English language.  It was designed for adults whose first language is not English, and was often used as a university admission criterion to judge whether applicants are sufficiently fluent to follow an English-language study program at a university level.

The test included three mandatory parts and one optional:
 Written composition
 Listening comprehension
 Grammar, cloze, vocabulary and reading comprehension multiple-choice questions
 An optional speaking test in the form of a one-on-one interview with an examiner

The MELAB was discontinued in June, 2018.

See also
 CaMLA 
 CaMLA English Placement Test (EPT)
 Examination for the Certificate of Competency in English (ECCE) 
 Examination for the Certificate of Proficiency in English (ECPE) 
 MTELP Series 
 Michigan English Test (MET) 
 Young Learners Tests of English (YLTE) 
 Cambridge English Language Assessment 
 English as a Foreign or Second Language

External links
 official site for the MELAB test

ESOL
CaMLA assessments
English-language education
English as a second or foreign language
Standardized tests for English language